"I Want You to Freak" is a song by British group Rak-Su. It samples Adina Howard's 1995 single "Freak Like Me". The band first performed the song during the live shows on the fifteenth season of The X Factor. The single has since peaked at number 39 on the UK Singles Chart, after debuting at number 58 on the chart dated 5 October 2018, becoming their second top 40 single after "Dimelo".

The single's music video was released on 4 October 2018, via the group's official YouTube account.

Charts

References 

2018 singles
Rak-Su songs
2018 songs
Songs written by Bootsy Collins
Songs written by George Clinton (funk musician)